The Ganja tramway network was a network of tramways forming part of the public transport system in Ganja, the second most populous city in Azerbaijan, for more than 40 years in the mid 20th century.

History
The network was opened on 1 May 1933, and was powered by electricity.  At its height, it consisted of four lines.  It was closed on 16 October 1976.

In January 2013, the government of Azerbaijan announced that it is planning to restore the tramway network in Ganja. The total length of the tramway network will be 15 km.

See also

List of town tramway systems in Asia

References

External links

 

Ganja, Azerbaijan
Ganja Trams
Ganja